Love Rocks NYC is an annual benefit concert, first held in 2017, that benefits non-profit God's Love We Deliver. The concert is held at the Beacon Theatre in New York City and was founded by menswear designer John Varvatos, Nicole Rechter and Greg Williamson.

History 
The annual concert was started in 2017 by Varvatos, Rechter and Williamson, who came up with the idea after speaking together at a fundraising dinner for God's Love We Deliver, of which Williamson is a board member. The concert raises money for the charity, which provides meals for those too sick to make, purchase or prepare meals themselves.

The concert features different Musicians and presenters every year. The house band, led by Will Lee with members Paul Shaffer, Eric Krasno, Larry Campbell, Steve Gadd and Shawn Pelton, plays every year.

The inaugural event was held at the Beacon Theatre on March 9, 2017.

As of June 2020, the event has raised $9 million in proceeds and has funded one million meals.

2017 
The inaugural lineup included the following artists and presenters:

 Jackson Browne
 Joe Walsh
 Bruce Willis
 Sam Moore
 Anthony Hamilton
 Aaron Neville
 Mavis Staples
 Michael McDonald
 Bill Murray
 Susan Tedeschi
 Derek Trucks
 Warren Haynes
 CeCe Winans
 Gary Clark, Jr.
The 2017 festival raised $1.5 million.

2018 
The second show took place on March 15, 2018, and was hosted by Whoopi Goldberg.

Performers and presenters included:

 Bill Murray
 Norah Jones
 Emmylou Harris
 Ziggy Marley
 Patty Smyth
 Lucinda Williams
 Mavis Staples
 Marc Cohn
 Billy Gibbons
 Gary Clark Jr
 Donald Fagen
 Keith Richards

The 2018 festival raised $2 million.

2019 
The 2019 show took place on March 7, 2019, which coincided with the 34th anniversary of the founding of God's Love We Deliver. It was hosted by Bill Murray and Martin Short. Goldberg was also scheduled to host, but pulled out due to health reasons.

The show featured presenters and artists like:

 Hozier
 Sheryl Crow
 Robert Plant
 Lukas Nelson
 Ann and Nancy Wilson of Heart
 Buddy Guy
 Bernie Williams

The 2019 festival raised $2.3 million.

2020 
The 4th annual Love Rocks NYC took place on March 12, 2020, as a restricted attendance-only event and all performances were live-streamed. The evening's emcees were Paul Shaffer and Tamara Tunie and late-night television host David Letterman made a surprise appearance.

The lineup included:

 Dave Matthews
 Chris and Rich Robinson of The Black Crowes
 Cyndi Lauper
 Jackson Browne
 Leon Bridges
 Warren Haynes
 Joss Stone
 Marcus King
 Susan Tedeschi
 Derek Trucks

The event raised $3 million, all of which went to God's Love We Deliver, as expenses were underwritten by The Steven and Alexandra Cohen Foundation.

2021 
The 5th annual show will take place at the Beacon Theater on June 3, 2021, if allowed by New York state and city regulations.

References 

Benefit concerts
Benefit concerts in the United States